Nightmoves is a 2007 jazz album by vocalist Kurt Elling. It was the first Elling album to be released by Concord Records.

Track listing 
 "Nightmoves" (Michael Franks, Michael Small) - 4:23
 "Tight" (Betty Carter) - 2:55
 "Change Partners"/"If You Never Come to Me" (Irving Berlin)/(Antonio Carlos Jobim, Aloísio de Oliveira, Ray Gilbert) - 7:38
 "Undun" (Randy Bachman) - 5:10
 "Where Are You?" (Harold Adamson, Jimmy McHugh) - 5:27
 "And We Will Fly" (Alan Pasqua, Kurt Elling, Phil Galdston) - 4:23
 "The Waking" (Elling, Rob Amster, Theodore Roethke) - 4:13
 "The Sleepers" (Fred Hersch, Walt Whitman) - 5:31
 "Leaving Again"/"In the Wee Small Hours" (Keith Jarrett, Elling)/(Bob Hilliard, David Mann) -  5:04
 "A New Body and Soul" (Johnny Green, Edward Heyman, Robert Sour, Frank Eyton) - 10:20
 "I Like the Sunrise" (Duke Ellington) - 6:53

Personnel 
 Kurt Elling - vocals
 Laurence Hobgood - piano
 Willie Jones, III - drums, shakers (on tracks 1, 3 and 6)
 Christian McBride - bass (1-4, 6 and 10)
 Rob Amster - bass (5, 7, 8 and 11)
 Rob Mounsey - electric piano, keyboards (1, 4 and 6)
 Bob Mintzer - tenor sax (1 and 4)
 Guilherme Monteiro - guitar (3 and 6)
 Rumero Lubambo - guitar (7)
 Howard Levy - harmonica (3)
 Gregoire Maret - harmonica (6)
 The Escher String Quartet (5 and 8)

References 

2007 albums
Kurt Elling albums
Concord Records albums